Chittar சித்தார்is a village in Bhavani taluk of Erode district, Tamil Nadu.

Location 
Chittar is about 26 km away from Erode Central Bus Stand and nearly a 13 km drive from Bhavani Bus Station. Stanley reservoir also known as Mettur Dam is 26 km from Chittar. Nearest railway junction is Erode and airport is Salem and Coimbatore.

Administration
Chittar is part of Kesarimangalm Panchayat, Ammapattai Union,
Bhavani (TK) Erode (DT)
MLA constituency Bhavani
MP constituency Tiruppur.

Demography
Chittar had a population of 2,500. Males constitute 50% of the population and females 50%. Chittar has an average literacy rate of 72%, higher than the national average of 59.5%; with male literacy of 78% and female literacy of 66%. 10% of the population is under 6 years of age.

References

Villages in Erode district